Lubinella is a genus of spiders in the family Uloboridae. It was first described in 1984 by Opell. This genus was named after arachnologist Yael D. Lubin. , it contains only one species, Lubinella morobensis, from New Guinea.

References

Uloboridae
Monotypic Araneomorphae genera
Spiders of Oceania